is a private eikaiwa English conversation school owned by the Mabuchi Education Group, a juku chain in Japan. Epion's students are largely pre-school aged-children through to teenagers. Many of them later go on to study at the Mabuchi jukus. It has 17 schools, 2,500 students and 35 foreign teaching staff.

General Union branch
Some teachers at Epion are represented by the Osaka-based General Union.

References

External links 
  
  

English conversation schools in Japan